William James O'Brien (born October 23, 1969), nicknamed The Teapot, is an American football coach who is the offensive coordinator and quarterbacks coach for the New England Patriots of the National Football League (NFL). He was the head coach of the Houston Texans from 2014 to 2020, and at Pennsylvania State University from 2012 to 2013. O'Brien also served as the general manager of the Texans in 2020 and as the offensive coordinator for the University of Alabama from 2021 to 2022. 

O'Brien began his coaching career in 1993 at Brown University before spending more than a decade coaching in the Atlantic Coast Conference (ACC). He joined the New England Patriots in 2007, eventually serving as quarterbacks coach and offensive coordinator in 2011. In 2012, O'Brien was hired by Penn State to take over a program that had just endured the Penn State child sex abuse scandal. In his first season as head coach, O'Brien led the team to an 8–4 record and won ESPN's National Coach of the Year award. After the 2012 season, he garnered significant interest to return to the National Football League (NFL) as a head coach and interviewed with both the Philadelphia Eagles and the Cleveland Browns. However, O'Brien decided to stay at Penn State, citing that it would send a poor message to leave after just one season. After his second season, O'Brien left Penn State to become the head coach of the Texans.

Following his tenure with the Texans, which also involved a 51–31 Divisional Round loss to the eventual Super Bowl winning Kansas City Chiefs team after leading 24–0 in the first quarter, and a controversial trade of star wide receiver DeAndre Hopkins to the Arizona Cardinals, O'Brien was fired by the Texans, and was hired by Alabama to be offensive coordinator from 2021 until 2023 when he was re-hired by the Patriots to be the offensive coordinator and quarterbacks coach.

Early life
O'Brien was born on October 23, 1969, in Dorchester, Massachusetts to John O'Brien and Anne Murphy O'Brien. He grew up in Andover, Massachusetts with his parents and two brothers, John and Tom. As a child, Bill played Little League. After graduating from St. John's Preparatory School in Danvers, O'Brien attended Brown University in Providence, Rhode Island, where he played defensive end and linebacker for the Brown Bears from 1990 to 1992.

Coaching career

College assistant
O'Brien's first coaching position was at Brown, where he coached tight ends in 1993 and inside linebackers in 1994. He then spent the next three seasons (1995–1997) as an offensive graduate assistant at Georgia Tech.

O'Brien then coached the Yellow Jackets' running backs from 1998 to 2000. In 1999, running back Sean Gregory ran for 837 yards with six touchdowns. The following year, running back Joe Burns ran for 908 yards with 12 touchdowns.

From 2001 to 2002, O'Brien served as offensive coordinator and quarterbacks coach and was named an assistant head coach for the 2002 season. In 2002, O'Brien was hired as Notre Dame's offensive Coordinator before George O'Leary was dismissed. As offensive coordinator at Georgia Tech in 2001 and 2002, his teams averaged 31 and 21.5 points per game, respectively as the teams went 9–4 and 7–6. In 2001, running back Joe Burns ran for 1,165 yards with 14 touchdowns and quarterback George Godsey threw for 3,085 yards with 18 touchdowns. In 2002 under Chan Gailey, running back Tony Hollings ran for 633 yards with 11 touchdowns, and wide receiver Kerry Watkins recorded 1,050 receiving yards and five touchdowns.

In 2003, O'Brien left to coach running backs at the University of Maryland, where he spent two seasons. In 2003, running back Josh Allen ran for 922 yards and eight touchdowns while Bruce Perry ran for 713 yards and six touchdowns.

As offensive coordinator at Duke in 2005 and 2006, O'Brien's teams averaged 16.1 and 14.9 points per game. In 2006, QB Thaddeus Lewis threw for 2,134 yards and 11 touchdowns.

New England Patriots
After two seasons with Duke, O'Brien was hired by the New England Patriots as an offensive assistant on February 27, 2007. On February 21, 2008, O'Brien was promoted to wide receivers coach. He became the quarterbacks coach and offensive play-caller following the 2008 season after the departure of quarterbacks coach and offensive coordinator Josh McDaniels. O'Brien was promoted to offensive coordinator in February 2011.

The Patriots gave the Jacksonville Jaguars permission to interview O'Brien for their head coaching vacancy during the Patriots' playoff bye week; O'Brien was scheduled for an interview, but never actually interviewed for the job. Instead, he interviewed with Penn State staff on January 5, 2012, was offered the head coach position and signed a four-year contract to become the Nittany Lions' coach. O'Brien continued as New England's offensive coordinator through Super Bowl XLVI.

Penn State
O'Brien was hired as Penn State's 15th head football coach, replacing Joe Paterno, who had coached the team from 1966 until his dismissal in 2011. He was introduced as the head coach at a press conference on January 7, 2012.

Response to sanctions
Due to the Penn State child sex abuse scandal, on July 24, 2012, the National Collegiate Athletics Association (NCAA) sanctioned Penn State with a four-year postseason ban and loss of 40 scholarships over a four-year period.

In light of these NCAA sanctions, O'Brien issued the following statement:

"Today we receive a very harsh penalty from the NCAA and as head coach of the Nittany Lions football program, I will do everything in my power to not only comply, but help guide the University forward to become a national leader in ethics, compliance and operational excellence. I knew when I accepted the position that there would be tough times ahead. But I am committed for the long term to Penn State and our student athletes.

I was then and I remain convinced that our student athletes are the best in the country. I could not be more proud to lead this team and these courageous and humble young men into the upcoming 2012 season. Together we are committed to building a better athletic program and university".

Because of a clause in his contract, O'Brien received an automatic four-year extension that guaranteed an extra year for every year of sanctions put on the program.

2012
In O'Brien's first game as Penn State's head coach, the Nittany Lions lost to the Ohio University Bobcats by a score of 24–14. His first win as the Penn State head coach took place on September 15, 2012, with a 34–7 win against the United States Naval Academy at Beaver Stadium, University Park, PA. Despite the fallout from the Jerry Sandusky scandal, O'Brien's first season as coach at Penn State was far more successful than anticipated and resulted in a final record of 8–4. He collected the most wins for a first-year head coach in school history and was awarded Big Ten Coach of the Year on November 27, 2012.

O'Brien was named the Big Ten Coach of the Year by both the media and the coaches. On December 8, 2012, he was named the national coach of the year by ESPN. On January 17, 2013, O'Brien was awarded the 2012 Paul "Bear" Bryant College Coach of the Year Award.

NFL interest
In January 2013, O'Brien interviewed for the head coaching position with the Cleveland Browns and Philadelphia Eagles. However, he decided to remain at Penn State, stating: "I'm not a one-and-done guy. I made a commitment to these players at Penn State and that's what I am going to do. I'm not gonna cut and run after one year, that's for sure."

Houston Texans

After Houston Texans head coach Gary Kubiak was fired on December 6, 2013, multiple reports stated that O'Brien was interested in returning to the NFL. On December 29, O'Brien met with the Texans for further discussion about the Texans' head coaching job. He was officially introduced as the Texans' head coach on January 2, 2014. The Texans had finished 2–14 in 2013 and owned the first overall selection in the 2014 NFL Draft, which they would use on South Carolina defensive end Jadeveon Clowney.

2014 season

O'Brien earned his first win as a head coach when the Texans beat the Washington Redskins in the season-opener by a score of 17–6. In O'Brien's first season with the Texans, they finished with a 9–7 record and narrowly missed the playoffs.

2015 season

In 2015, the Texans again finished with a 9–7 record and finished atop the AFC South. In the Wild Card Round of the playoffs, the Texans were blown out 30–0 by the Kansas City Chiefs.

2016 season

In 2016, the Texans finished with a 9–7 record for the third consecutive year and won their second consecutive AFC South title. The Texans defeated the Oakland Raiders by a score of 27–14 in the Wild Card Round, but then lost on the road in the Divisional Round by a score of 34–16 to the eventual Super Bowl champions, the New England Patriots.

2017 season

The 2017 season marked O'Brien's first as an NFL head coach in which his team did not finish with a winning record. The Texans had a 4–12 record, losing nine of their final 10 games. This season saw the debut of quarterback Deshaun Watson, whom the Texans selected in the first round with the 12th overall pick in the 2017 NFL Draft. However, Watson's season prematurely ended after he tore his ACL in practice prior to Week 9, which along with injuries to various other players contributed to the team's collapse.

2018 season

On January 13, 2018, O'Brien received a four-year contract extension.

The Texans started the season 0–3, but then went on a nine-game winning streak and finished atop the division with an 11–5 record. Their season ended when they lost to the Indianapolis Colts in the Wild Card Round by a score of 21–7.

2019 season

In 2019, the Texans finished with a 10–6 record and captured another division title. The Texans outlasted the Buffalo Bills in the Wild Card Round with a 22–19 victory in overtime, overcoming a 16–0 halftime deficit. They were eliminated in the Divisional round with a 51–31 road loss to the eventual Super Bowl LIV champion Kansas City Chiefs despite a 24–0 lead in the first quarter.

On January 28, 2020, O'Brien was appointed as the Texans' general manager. The Texans had gone the entire 2019 season with the position vacant. During the offseason, O'Brien traded wide receiver DeAndre Hopkins and a fourth-round pick in the 2020 NFL Draft to the Arizona Cardinals for running back David Johnson, a 2020 second-round pick, and a 2021 fourth-round pick, a move that was highly criticized.

2020 season

Following a 0–4 start in 2020, O'Brien was fired by the Texans on October 5, 2020. He finished his tenure in Houston with a  regular-season record and a  playoff record for a combined record of 54–52.

Alabama
On January 21, 2021, O'Brien was named the offensive coordinator and quarterbacks coach at the University of Alabama under head coach Nick Saban, replacing Steve Sarkisian, who left to become the head coach at the University of Texas at Austin.

Return to New England
On January 24, 2023, O'Brien was named the offensive coordinator and quarterbacks coach of the New England Patriots.

Personal life
O'Brien and his wife, Colleen, have two sons, Jack and Michael. Jack, the elder son, has a rare brain disorder called lissencephaly.

Head coaching record

College

 ‡ Ineligible for Big Ten title, bowl game and Coaches Poll

NFL

References

External links
 New England Patriots profile

1969 births
Living people
American football defensive ends
American football linebackers
Alabama Crimson Tide football coaches
Brown Bears football coaches
Brown Bears football players
Duke Blue Devils football coaches
Georgia Tech Yellow Jackets football coaches
Houston Texans executives
Houston Texans head coaches
Maryland Terrapins football coaches
New England Patriots coaches
National Football League offensive coordinators
Penn State Nittany Lions football coaches
People from Dorchester, Massachusetts
Sportspeople from Boston
Coaches of American football from Massachusetts
Players of American football from Boston